Zamina Hasan qizi Hasanova (10 May 1918, Corat, Sumqayit, Azerbaijan SSR – 2006, Sumqayit, Azerbaijan) was a Hero of Socialist Labour, Honorary Citizen of Sumgayit and the first female metallurgist in Azerbaijan.

Biography 
Zamina Hasanova was born on May 10, 1918 in Sumgayit, present-day Jorat settlement.

Career 
Hasanova started her first work at the Sumgayit Power Station. During the Soviet era, she worked as the chairman of the Energy Union and was engaged in laying the foundations of residential buildings. She worked in the civil defence system of Baku during the Second World War. After the war, she continued her career at the Boruprokat factory. Later, she served as a brigadier. Hasanova was the chief brigadier in 1970 and led four brigades at that factory.

Public career 
Hasanova was one of the organizers of the Horizont 8 club for schoolchildren. She was the member of Sumgait City Council and Supreme Council of the USSR.

Honors 
Zamina Hasanova was awarded
 Order of Lenin (1960)
 Hero of Socialist Labour (1960)
 Honorary Citizen of Sumgayit (1969)

On October 2, 2002, by the order of the President of Azerbaijan, Zamina Hasanova was awarded with personal scholarship of the President of Azerbaijan for her activities in science, education, culture and economy.

Memorial 
Zamina Hasanova died in Sumgayit in 2006. The song titled "Zamina" composed by Alakbar Taghiyev was dedicated to Hasanova.

See also 
 Hero of Socialist Labour

References 

1922 births
2006 deaths
Soviet metallurgists
Azerbaijani women scientists
Heroes of Socialist Labour
People from Sumgait
Recipients of the Order of Lenin
Soviet women scientists